Endroedymolpus is a genus of leaf beetles in the subfamily Eumolpinae, found in South Africa. The genus is named in memory of Dr. Sebastian Endrödy-Younga, who collected a large number of the specimens of the genus. It belongs to the tribe Adoxini and is related to the genus Macetes.

Species
 Endroedymolpus peringueyi (Lefèvre, 1890)
 Endroedymolpus smaragdinus Zoia, 2001
 Endroedymolpus taurinus Zoia, 2001

References

Eumolpinae
Chrysomelidae genera
Beetles of Africa
Endemic beetles of South Africa